Lefaux is a commune in the Pas-de-Calais department in the Hauts-de-France region of France.

Geography
Lefaux is situated 8 miles (16 km) north of Montreuil-sur-Mer on the D148 road.

Population

Places of interest
 The nineteenth century church of Saint-Jean-Baptiste
 The semaphore tower at Lefaux, a remnant of the first telegraphic system, created by Claude Chappe in 1793.

See also
 Communes of the Pas-de-Calais department

References

Communes of Pas-de-Calais